Nelly Jepkosgei (born 14 July 1991) is a Kenyan-born female middle-distance runner who specialises in the 800 metres. She originally competed for Kenya, running at the 2010 World Junior Championships in Athletics and the 2011 All-Africa Games, but now competes for Bahrain. A dispute between the national bodies resulted in Jepkosgei being ineligible to run for Bahrain until March 2021, and she failed to represent her nation of birth at the 2019 African Games, despite being selected. She holds personal bests of 1:58.96 minutes for the 800 m and 4:00.99 minutes for the 1500 metres. She also holds the Kenyan national record for the 1000 metres with her time of 2:35.30 minutes.

She has won three times on the IAAF Diamond League circuit, taking wins at the Memorial Van Damme in 2013, and Athletissima and the Meeting International Mohammed VI d'Athlétisme de Rabat in 2019.

International competitions

Circuit wins
800 metres
IAAF Diamond League
Athletissima: 2019
Meeting International Mohammed VI d'Athlétisme de Rabat: 2019
IAAF World Challenge
Nanjing World Challenge: 2019

Personal bests
400 metres: 53.8 (2017)
800 metres: 1:58.96 (2018)
1000 metres: 2:35.30 (2018) 
1500 metres: 4:00.99 (2018)
Mile run: 4:25.15 (2017)

References

External links

1991 births
Living people
Kenyan female middle-distance runners
Bahraini female middle-distance runners
African Games competitors for Kenya
Athletes (track and field) at the 2011 All-Africa Games